The 2022 WTA Finals was the professional women's championship tennis tournament run by the Women's Tennis Association (WTA) from October 31 to November 7, 2022. It was the 51st edition of the singles event and the 46th edition of the doubles competition. The tournament was held on an indoor hardcourt at the Dickies Arena in Fort Worth, Texas, marking the return of the tournament to the United States after 17 years, and was contested by the eight highest-ranked singles players and doubles teams of the 2022 WTA Tour.

Champions

Singles

  Caroline Garcia def.  Aryna Sabalenka 7–6(7–4), 6–4

This is Garcia's fourth title of the year and eleventh of her career.

Doubles

  Veronika Kudermetova /  Elise Mertens def.  Barbora Krejčíková /  Kateřina Siniaková 6–2, 4–6, [11–9]

Tournament

The 2022 WTA Finals is the 51st edition of the singles event and the 46th of the doubles competition. It is currently being contested by the season's top eight singles players and top eight doubles teams.

The tournament was originally scheduled to take place at the Shenzhen Bay Sports Center in Shenzhen, China as a part of the WTA Tour's ten-year deal with Shenzhen, beginning in 2019. However, on December 2, 2021, WTA chairman Steve Simon announced that all tournaments scheduled to be held in both China and Hong Kong would be suspended beginning in 2022, due to concerns regarding the security and well-being of tennis player Peng Shuai after her allegations of sexual assault against Zhang Gaoli, a high-ranking member of the Chinese Communist Party, and the travel restrictions owing to the COVID-19 pandemic in mainland China.

On September 6, 2022, the WTA announced that the event would take place at the Dickies Arena in Fort Worth, Texas, United States from October 31 to November 7, 2022, and return to China the following year.

Qualifying
In the singles, point totals are calculated by combining point totals from sixteen tournaments (excluding ITF and WTA 125 tournaments). Of these sixteen tournaments, a player's results from the four Grand Slam events, the four WTA 1000 tournaments with 1,000 points for the winner, and (for the players who played the main draw of least 2 such tournaments) the best results from two WTA 1000 tournaments with 900 points for the winner must be included.

In the doubles, point totals are calculated by any combination of eleven tournaments throughout the year. Unlike in the singles, this combination does not need to include results from the Grand Slams or WTA 1000 tournaments.

Format
Both the singles and doubles event features eight players/teams in a round-robin event, split into two groups of four.

Over the first four days of competition, each player/team meets the other three players/teams in her group, with the top two in each group advancing to the semifinals. The first-placed player/team in one group meets the second-placed player/team in the other group, and vice versa. The winners of each semifinal meet in the championship match.

Round robin tie-breaking methods
The final standings are made using these methods:

 Greatest number of match wins.
 Greatest number of matches played.
 Head-to-head results if only two players are tied, or if three players are tied then:

a. If three players each have the same number of wins, a player having played less than all three matches is automatically eliminated and the player advancing to the single elimination competition is the winner of the match-up of the two remaining tied players.
b. Highest percentage of sets won.
c. Highest percentage of games won.

Prize money and points
The total prize money for the 2022 WTA Finals is US$5,000,000. The tables below are based on the updated draw sheet information.

 An undefeated champion would earn the maximum 1,500 points, and $1,680,000 in singles or $340,000 in doubles.

Qualified players

Singles

Iga Świątek and Ons Jabeur were announced as the first qualifiers on 12 September.

Iga Świątek began 2022 by reaching the semifinals in Adelaide and the Australian Open, before embarking upon a remarkable run. Ṡwiątek won her first title of the year at Doha, defeating top-ten players Aryna Sabalenka, Maria Sakkari, and Anett Kontaveit in successive matches. She next won Indian Wells and Miami back-to-back, becoming the first woman since Victoria Azarenka in 2016, and just the fourth woman overall, to win the Sunshine Double in singles. Upon the retirement of world No. 1 Ashleigh Barty in March 2022, Świątek gained the world No. 1 ranking for the first time upon winning her second round match at Miami.

This victory was followed by consecutive victories at Stuttgart and Rome, before winning her second Grand Slam title at the French Open. Her run came to an end at Wimbledon, comprising 37 consecutive match wins and six titles. After some lacklustre tournaments throughout the summer, Świątek won her third Grand Slam title at the US Open, defeating Jessica Pegula, Aryna Sabalenka, and Ons Jabeur back-to-back to win the title. Świątek would go on to reach the final in Ostrava, losing to Barbora Krejčíková in three close sets, before winning the title in San Diego. Although Świątek received the requisite points to qualify for the WTA Finals in May 2022, her participation was not confirmed until 12 September 2022.

Ons Jabeur is the first player from Tunisia, and the first Arab and North African woman, to qualify for the WTA Finals. She began 2022 in Sydney, but retired from her match against Anett Kontaveit after sustaining a back injury, forcing her to withdraw from all events up to Dubai. She would next reach the final in Charleston, losing to Belinda Bencic in the final. After a close-fought loss to Paula Badosa in Stuttgart, Jabeur would become the first Arab and African woman to win a WTA 1000 title, doing so in Madrid. She defeated the likes of Belinda Bencic, Simona Halep, and Jessica Pegula to win her first clay-court title. This was followed by a runner-up finish in Rome, another WTA 1000 event, where she defeated Maria Sakkari and Daria Kasatkina, before losing in the final to Iga Świątek. A successful clay season was finished with a surprise first-round loss at the French Open.

After winning her third title in Berlin, Jabeur became the first African and Arab woman to reach a Grand Slam final, losing to Elena Rybakina at Wimbledon. Jabeur would later reach a second Grand Slam final at the US Open, defeating Veronika Kudermetova and Caroline Garcia before losing once again to Iga Świątek.

On October 13, Jessica Pegula was announced as the third qualifier. 

Jessica Pegula would emerge as one of the most consistent players in the 2022 season. She would reach the quarterfinals of the Australian Open, losing to the eventual champion Ashleigh Barty. She would perform consistently in Dubai and Doha, before reaching the semifinals of Miami, losing to Iga Świątek. She would later lose in the final of Madrid to Ons Jabeur, and to Aryna Sabalenka in Rome. She would reach the quarterfinals of the French Open, losing once again to Iga Świątek; she next participated at Wimbledon, losing in the third round.

She performed consistently in the North American season, losing to three eventual champions: to Simona Halep in the semifinals of Toronto, to Caroline Garcia in Cincinnati, and to Iga Świątek in the quarterfinals of the US Open. She would lose once again to Iga Świątek in the semifinals of San Diego, before winning her second WTA Tour singles title and first WTA 1000 title in Guadalajara, defeating Elena Rybakina, Bianca Andreescu, Sloane Stephens, Victoria Azarenka, and Maria Sakkari consecutively.

On October 19, Coco Gauff was announced as the fourth qualifier.

Coco Gauff emerged as the most successful teenager since Maria Sharapova throughout the 2022 season. Gauff reached the semifinals in Adelaide, and would later reach the quarterfinals in Doha, defeating Caroline Garcia and Paula Badosa, but losing to Maria Sakkari. Gauff would also perform well in Indian Wells and Miami, losing to the eventual champion Iga Świątek in the latter tournament. After consistent results throughout the clay season, she would reach her first Grand Slam final French Open, losing once again to Iga Świątek.

She reached the semifinals of Berlin, the quarterfinals of San Jose, and the quarterfinals of Toronto. She would also reach the quarterfinals of the US Open, losing to Caroline Garcia, and would later lose in the quarterfinals of San Diego to Iga Świątek, and in the quarterfinals of Guadalajara to Victoria Azarenka. Despite being one of the year's most consistent players, Gauff failed to win a title in the year.

On October 21, Maria Sakkari was announced as the final qualifier.

Maria Sakkari had a successful start to the year, reaching the fourth round of the Australian Open. She would reach the finals of St. Petersburg, losing to Anett Kontaveit, and would later reach the semifinals of Doha, and the final of Indian Wells, losing in both instances to Iga Świątek. After a poor clay court season, reaching just one quarterfinal in Rome, Sakkari reached a quarterfinal in Nottingham and a semifinal in Berlin. 

After mediocre results throughout the summer, Sakkari would reach the final in Parma, losing to Mayar Sherif, and would reach another WTA 1000 final at Guadalajara, losing to Jessica Pegula. Sakkari would become the last player to qualify for the WTA Finals after defeating Veronika Kudermetova in the Guadalajara quarterfinals, although she did not win a title in 2022.

On October 19, Caroline Garcia was announced as the fifth qualifier.

Caroline Garcia suffered a mixed start to the year, reaching the quarterfinals of Sydney, but losing in the opening rounds of Melbourne and the Australian Open. She would reach the semifinals of Lyon, losing to Zhang Shuai, but would suffer inconsistent results throughout the North American hard court swing, and did not perform to the best of her ability on the European spring clay court season. She would later win the title at Bad Homburg, defeating Alizé Cornet and Bianca Andreescu en route to the title, and would reach the fourth round of the Wimbledon Championships. A successful summer season was capped off by reaching the semifinals in Lausanne and the quarterfinals in Palermo, before winning the title in Warsaw, defeating the world No. 1 Iga Świątek in the process.

Garcia would later win the title in Cincinnati, defeating Maria Sakkari, Jessica Pegula, Aryna Sabalenka, and Petra Kvitová; she would also reach the semifinals of the US Open. Despite this, she would suffer a mediocre end to the season, winning one match in three tournaments.

On October 20, Aryna Sabalenka and Daria Kasatkina were announced as the sixth and seventh qualifiers, respectively.

Aryna Sabalenka suffered with service yips early in the year, losing in the first round of two events in Adelaide. Improvements began to manifest at the Australian Open, where she reached the fourth round. She would reach the quarterfinals of Doha, losing to Iga Świątek, but she lost early in Indian Wells and Miami. She would defeat Bianca Andreescu, Anett Kontaveit, and Paula Badosa in Stuttgart, losing to Iga Świątek in the final, and would also lose to Świątek in the semifinals of Rome. She would reach the third round of the French Open.

She would next reach the final of 's-Hertogenbosch, but could not participate at Wimbledon. She reached the semifinals of Cincinnati, and would also reach the semifinals of the US Open, losing for the fourth time in 2022 to the eventual champion, Iga Świątek. She would next lose in the quarterfinals of San Diego, and early in Guadalajara. Despite her consistent performance throughout the year, Sabalenka did not win a title in 2022.

Daria Kasatkina had a successful start to the year, reaching the semifinals in Melbourne and Sydney. She would suffer three early defeats at the Australian Open, Dubai, and Doha, all to Iga Świątek, and would also lose early at Indian Wells and Miami. She would perform well in Charleston and Madrid, and would reach the semifinals of Rome, losing to Ons Jabeur. She would reach her first Grand Slam semifinal at the French Open, defeating Camila Giorgi and Veronika Kudermetova, before losing once again to Iga Świątek. Kasatkina would reach the quarterfinals in Berlin, losing to Maria Sakkari, and would also reach the quarterfinals in Bad Homburg.

She would win her first title of the year in San Jose, defeating Elena Rybakina, Aryna Sabalenka, and Paula Badosa en route. After early losses in Toronto and Cincinnati, she would win a second title in Granby. Despite her success earlier in the year, Kasatkina would struggle with consistency following her second title, failing to clear the third round of any tournament for the remainder of the season.

Doubles

Groupings

Singles 
The singles draw of the 2022 edition of the Year–end Championships will feature one number-one and major champion, and two major finalists. The competitors were divided into two groups.

Doubles 
The doubles draw of the 2022 edition of the Year–end Championships will feature four number-ones, three major champions and two major finalist teams. The pairs were divided into two groups.

Points breakdown
Updated .

Singles

Doubles

Notes

Head-to-head records
Below are the singles head-to-head records as of 31 October 2022.

Singles

Doubles

See also
2022 WTA Tour
2022 ATP Finals

References

External links

WTA Finals
2022 in American tennis
WTA Finals
WTA Finals